Peter John Philip Vivian (born 5 November 1970) is a retired English hammer thrower.

Athletics career
Vivian represented England and won a bronze medal, at the 1994 Commonwealth Games in Victoria, British Columbia. He also competed at the 1995 World Championships without reaching the final.

His personal best throw was 71.28 metres, achieved in June 1995 in Villeneuve d'Ascq.

References

1970 births
Living people
English male hammer throwers
Commonwealth Games medallists in athletics
Commonwealth Games bronze medallists for England
Athletes (track and field) at the 1994 Commonwealth Games
World Athletics Championships athletes for Great Britain
Medallists at the 1994 Commonwealth Games